Qarqin is a town located in the northern part of Qarqin District, Jowzjan Province, Afghanistan at  at 249 m altitude on the southern bank of the Amu Darya River,  Qarqin is the center of Qarqin District.

The population is about 16,500 people.

See also 
 Qarqin District
 Jowzjan Province

References 

Populated places in Jowzjan Province